Fortunato Brescia Tassano (died 1951) was an Italian-born Peruvian businessman who founded Grupo Breca, a real estate company-turned-conglomerate. He emigrated to Peru in 1889.

References

1951 deaths
Italian emigrants to Peru
20th-century Peruvian businesspeople
Real estate company founders
Brescia family